Meterana pascoei is a moth in the family Noctuidae, endemic to New Zealand. The name and description were published as Morrisonia pascoei by William George Howes in 1912. It is about 38 mm long, with reddish-brown forewings marked with faint lines and a pair of kidney-shaped marks, and a reddish-brown abdomen with a pronounced tuft at the end. Howes named the species in honour of Merlin O. Pasco of Queenstown, who had sent him 20 specimens caught at a treacle-baited moth trap – Howes had previously collected just two specimens, in 1910. In 1928, in his book The Butterflies and moths of New Zealand, George Vernon Hudson discussed this species, placing it within the genus Melanchra and editing the epithet to "pascoi". John S. Dugdale also used the epithet "pascoi" and proposed several new synonyms for this species in his 1988 publication Lepidoptera - annotated catalogue, and keys to family group taxa.

Many institutions and databases such as the New Zealand Arthropod Collection, the New Zealand Threat Classification website, the entomological collections of the Museum of New Zealand Te Papa Tongarewa and the Auckland War Memorial Museum, use the epithet "pascoi". This is an unjustified emendation of the original spelling, and contrary to ICZN Art. 32.5.1.

References

External links

 Landcare Research gallery of New Zealand Noctuidae

Moths described in 1912
Moths of New Zealand
Endemic fauna of New Zealand
Hadeninae
Taxa named by George Howes (entomologist)
Endemic moths of New Zealand